Giannino Caruana Demajo (born 1958) is a Maltese judge. He is a graduate of the University of Malta.

See also 
Judiciary of Malta

References 

Living people
1958 births
University of Malta alumni
Place of birth missing (living people)
Date of birth missing (living people)
20th-century Maltese judges
21st-century Maltese judges